Komugi  is a river flowing in the Kallakurichi district of the Indian state of Tamil Nadu.

References

See also 
List of rivers of Tamil Nadu

Rivers of Tamil Nadu
Kallakurichi district
Rivers of India